Laguna Honda is a reservoir on the southwest shoulder of Mount Sutro in San Francisco, California, U.S.A.

History
The 1906 San Francisco earthquake destroyed the pipeline. The lake and the surrounding land are now managed by the San Francisco Public Utilities Commission.

See also 
 List of lakes in California
 List of lakes in the San Francisco Bay Area

References 

Reservoirs in San Francisco
Reservoirs in California
Reservoirs in Northern California